Thorpe Island is one of the middle islands of the Family Islands group within the locality of Dunk in the Cassowary Coast Region, Queensland. Australia. It is about 15 km east of Tully Heads. It is also known as Timana Island.

In 1770 Captain James Cook discovered The Family Group of Islands. The largest he named "The Father Isle" and titled it Dunk Island, the second-largest he named "The Mother Isle", now Bedarra Island, and the smallest islands were the children: Timana Island the baby, the Twins and the triplets.

Thorpe Island is privately owned with one residence. It is one of only a few Australian islands which are owned freehold

References

Islands of Queensland
Islands of Far North Queensland
Private islands of Australia